Miedwinka is a river of Poland. It terminates into Lake Miedwie, which is drained by the Płonia.

Rivers of Poland
Rivers of West Pomeranian Voivodeship